Alexander Montgomery may refer to:

Alexander Montgomery (1667–1722), Irish MP for Monaghan County 1713–1722
Alexander Montgomery (1686–1729), Irish MP for Donegal Borough and for Donegal County 1727–1729
Alexander Montgomery (died 1785) (1721–1785), Irish MP for Monaghan County 1743–1760 and 1768–1783
Alexander Montgomery (1720–1800), Irish MP for Donegal County 1768–1800
Sir Alexander Montgomery, 3rd Baronet (1807–1888), a Royal Navy officer
Alexander B. Montgomery (1837–1910), US Representative from Kentucky
Alexander Montgomery (Mississippi lawyer) (died 1878), justices of the Supreme Court of Mississippi
Alexander Montgomery (geologist) (1862–1932), Scottish-born New Zealand/Australian geologist

See also
Alexander Montgomerie (disambiguation)